Liu Liankun (January 1933 – 15 August 1999), was a Major General (Shao Jiang) in the People's Liberation Army who provided the Republic of China (ROC) in Taiwan with secret intelligence about the status of missiles from the People's Republic of China (PRC). During the 1996 missile crisis, the ROC Ministry of National Defense notified the public that the missiles launched by the PRC actually carried unarmed warheads. This tipped off Beijing that Taipei had a high-level mole working on the mainland. Liu, a top Chinese military logistics officer, was arrested, court-martialed and executed in 1999.

The Military Intelligence Bureau (MIB) confirmed that Liu was one of its spies in 2018.

See also
Tong Daning

References

Taiwanese spies
1933 births
1999 deaths
Executed People's Republic of China people
Executed spies
People's Liberation Army generals from Heilongjiang
20th-century executions by China
People from Qiqihar
Executed military leaders
Executed people from Heilongjiang
Executed Chinese people
People executed by China by lethal injection
Expelled members of the Chinese Communist Party